Shelter aka Shelter Me is a 2007 Italian romantic drama film co-written and directed by Marco Simon Puccioni and starring Maria de Medeiros, Antonia Liskova, and Mounir Ouadi. The film was presented at the 57th Berlin International Film Festival in 2007.

Cast

Awards and nominations
The film received the Grand Prix award from the Annecy Italian Film Festival.

 2007 - Annecy Italian Film Festival
 Best Actress Award: Antonia Liskova
 2008 - David di Donatello
 Nominated for Best Actress: Antonia Liskova
 2008 - Nastro d'Argento
 European Nastro d'Argento: Antonia Liskova
 2008 - Globo d'oro
 Best Actress in Appearance: Antonia Liskova
 Best European Actress: Maria de Medeiros
 Nominated for Best Actress: Antonia Liskova

References

External links

2007 films
2007 romantic drama films
Lesbian-related films
2000s Italian-language films
Italian romantic drama films
Italian LGBT-related films
Films shot in Italy
Films shot in France
LGBT-related romantic drama films
2007 LGBT-related films